Thomas Henry (1779July 20, 1849) was an Anti-Masonic and Whig member of the U.S. House of Representatives from Pennsylvania.

Biography
Henry was born in County Down in the Kingdom of Ireland.  Immigrated to America and settled in Beaver, Pennsylvania, in 1798.  He was appointed justice of the peace by Governor Simon Snyder on December 24, 1808.  He was elected county commissioner in 1810.  He served as captain of a company that went from Beaver to help defend the northern frontier from a threatened British invasion in 1814.  He was elected a member of the Pennsylvania House of Representatives in 1815.  He served as prothonotary and clerk of courts from 1816 to 1821, and was elected sheriff of the county in 1821.  He was proprietor and editor of the Western Argus from 1821 to 1831.  He served as county treasurer in 1828 and 1829.

Henry was elected as an Anti-Masonic candidate to the Twenty-fifth and Twenty-sixth Congresses and reelected as a Whig to the Twenty-seventh Congress.  He died in Beaver in 1849.  Interment in Old Beaver Cemetery.

References

The Political Graveyard

1779 births
1849 deaths
People from County Down
Irish emigrants to the United States (before 1923)
Anti-Masonic Party members of the United States House of Representatives from Pennsylvania
Whig Party members of the United States House of Representatives from Pennsylvania
19th-century American politicians
Members of the Pennsylvania House of Representatives
Pennsylvania prothonotaries
People from Pennsylvania in the War of 1812